Mak Adam Lind (born Mohammed Ali Khan, ; 1 November 1988) is a Lebanese professional football player and manager who plays for Swedish club Nova FC and is the head coach of Swedish club Norrby IF.

Born in Lebanon to Lebanese parents, Lind moved to Sweden and obtained Swedish citizenship. He has represented Lebanon internationally between 2013 and 2015.

Managerial career 
On 2 March 2016, it was confirmed that Lind was the new manager of Västra Frölunda IF. He still continued to play for Halmstads BK. But after only two matches in the charge of the club, he was forced to terminate his contract on 10 March 2016, because Halmstads BK didn't want him to play and coach at the same time.

Lind was appointed as the new manager of Husqvarna FF for the 2017 season on 28 November 2016. After the death of Husqvarna's sporting director, Issa Iskander, Lind took over this role as well.

On 15 December 2017, Lind was announced as the new manager of Norrby IF for the 2018 season. On 23 October 2019, Norrby IF extended his contract to 2022.

Personal life 
Until 2013 Lind had believed that he was born in 1986, but after locating his original Lebanon birth certificate it was discovered that he was really born in 1988 and had in reality had made his Superettan first team debut at the age of 15.

Born Mohammed Ali Khan, in 2019 he changed his name to Mak Adam Lind.

Honours 
Individual
 IFFHS All-time Lebanon Men's Dream Team

References

External links

 
 
  (archived)
 
 Mak Lind at Lagstatistik

1988 births
Living people
Footballers from Beirut
Lebanese emigrants to Sweden
Sportspeople of Lebanese descent
Naturalized citizens of Sweden
Lebanese footballers
Swedish footballers
Association football central defenders
Västra Frölunda IF players
BK Häcken players
Tianjin Jinmen Tiger F.C. players
Halmstads BK players
Superettan players
Ettan Fotboll players
Allsvenskan players
Chinese Super League players
Lebanon international footballers
Lebanese expatriate footballers
Swedish expatriate footballers
Lebanese expatriate sportspeople in China
Swedish expatriate sportspeople in China
Expatriate footballers in China
Lebanese football managers
Swedish football managers
Västra Frölunda IF managers
Husqvarna FF managers
Norrby IF managers
Superettan managers